Chaturbhuj is a mountain of the Garhwal Himalaya in Uttarakhand, India. It is 52nd highest located entirely within the Uttrakhand. Nanda Devi, is the highest mountain in this category. Chaturbhuj lies between the Matri  and Shwetvarn . Its nearest higher neighbor Yogeshwar lies 2.7 km east. It is located 5.9 km NW of chirbas Parbat  and 8.5 km east lies Sri Kailash .

Climbing history

An Indo-French expedition led by Harish Kapadia had the privilege of First ascent on 5 June 1981. The Summiters are Hubert Odier, Alain de Blanchaud and Jacques Giraud. They Started from camp on Swetvarn Bamak to a col in the north. Then followed the north ridge to the summit. Chaturbhuj was never attempted before this.

Glaciers and rivers

Gulligad Bamak lies on the Northern side of Chaturbhuj from where Gulligad nala emerges and it joins Jadhganga river between Naga and Neylong. which later joins Bhagirathi river near Bharion ghati one of the main tributaries of river Ganga. On the south east side lies Swetvarn Glacier which joins Raktvarn Glacier and Raktvarn drain itself near Gomukh beside Gangotri Glacier and part of Bhagirathi river. Bhagirathi River comes out From the snout of Gangotri Glacier. Bhagirathi joins the Alaknanda River the other main tributaries of river Ganga at Dev Prayag and called Ganga there after.

Neighboring peaks

Neighboring peaks of Chaturbhuj:

 Chirbas Parbat 
 Matri 
 Sudarshan Parbat 
 Kalidhang 
 Yogeshwar:

See also

 List of Himalayan peaks of Uttarakhand

References

Mountains of Uttarakhand
Six-thousanders of the Himalayas
Geography of Chamoli district